John Allan Cameron,  (16 December 1938 – 22 November 2006) was a Canadian folk singer, "The Godfather of Celtic Music" in Canada. Noted for performing traditional music on his twelve string guitar, he released his first album in 1969. He released 10 albums during his lifetime and was featured on national television. He was a recipient of the East Coast Music Award's Lifetime Achievement Award and the Order of Canada, conferred in 2003.

Biography
Cameron was born in Inverness County, Nova Scotia to Dan L. Cameron and Catherine Anne (Katie Anne) MacDonald. Katie Anne (1914–1983) was the only sibling of renowned Cape Breton fiddler and composer Dan Rory MacDonald. In 1957 John Allan moved to Ottawa, Ontario where he studied to be a Roman Catholic priest through the Order of the Oblate Fathers. In 1964, a few months before ordination, Cameron obtained a dispensation from the church to pursue studies in education at St. Francis Xavier University, and eventually a career in music.

He was a regular on Singalong Jubilee in the 1960s and he was later host of two Canadian television series. The first was the Montreal-produced John Allan Cameron on CTV from 1975 to 1976. 
Guests included Stan Rogers, Edith Butler, The Good Brothers, Stringband, Colleen Peterson, Adam Mitchell, Michael Cooney, Shirley Eikhard, Liam Clancy, Tommy Makem, Nancy White, Steve Goodman, and Rhythm Pals. Cameron would return to national television on CBC with the Halifax-produced The John Allan Cameron Show which ran from 1979 to 1981. He was also a guest star on Sharon, Lois & Bram's The Elephant Show in 1986. John Allan Cameron also was the host of Super Variety Tonight, a CBC television special that aired on Sunday, 4 April 1982 featuring several guests including Sharon, Lois & Bram.

Besides his numerous television and concert appearances, he performed at the Grand Ole Opry in 1970.

In January 2005, Cameron was diagnosed with myelodysplastic syndrome. Several benefit projects such as concerts and a tribute CD were produced to support costs resulting from his treatment of this cancer.

On 22 November 2006, Cameron died in Toronto.

Cameron's son, Stuart Cameron is also an accomplished musician.

Discography

Albums

Compilations

Singles

Footnotes

External links
 

1938 births
2006 deaths
Deaths from myelodysplastic syndrome
Canadian country singer-songwriters
Canadian folk singer-songwriters
Canadian male singer-songwriters
20th-century Canadian Roman Catholic priests
Canadian television variety show hosts
Deaths from bone cancer
Members of the Order of Canada
Musicians from Nova Scotia
People from Inverness County, Nova Scotia
St. Francis Xavier University alumni
Canadian people of Scottish descent
Deaths from cancer in Ontario
20th-century Canadian male singers